Radu Grigorovici (November 20, 1911 – August 2, 2008) was a Romanian physicist.

Biography
Radu Grigorovici was born on November 20, 1911 in Chernivtsi, being the only son of the Bucovina Social Democrats Gheorghe and Tatiana Grigorovici. After graduating from Aron Pumnul High School (1928) he studied at the Chernivtsi University, and in 1931 he got a degree in chemical sciences and in 1934 a degree in physical sciences. At the same university, he was then a trainer at the Experimental Physics Laboratory of Professor Eugen Bădărău.

In 1936 he transferred to the Faculty of Sciences of the University of Bucharest, where Bădărău had been called as head of the Laboratory of Molecular, Acoustic and Optical Physics. In 1938 he obtained a PhD in physical sciences with a dissertation on the disruptive potential of mercury vapor. He climbed the ranks of the university hierarchy, becoming an associate professor in 1949. Between 1947-1957 he worked in parallel in the light source industry (Lumen factory, then Electrofar), as a consulting engineer. He was forced, for political reasons, to give up his university career. He retired from research, becoming head of department (1960) and deputy scientific director (1963) at the Bucharest Institute of Physics of the RPR Academy; in 1970 the institute will be subordinated to the State Committee for Nuclear Energy. In 1973 he applied for retirement, continuing his activity as a leading part-time scientific researcher; in 1977, following a reorganization, he was transferred to the Institute of Physics and Materials Technology, and after a year his employment contract was terminated.

Radu Grigorovici made original contributions to the physics of electric gas discharges, flame spectral analysis, light sources, physiological and instrumental optics, size systems and physical-physiological units. At the Bucharest Institute of Physics, he organized and led a group of researchers who studied the phenomena of transport in disordered thin metal layers, explained by the band structure of the respective metals (1959-1966). But the most important results were obtained in the study of amorphous semiconductors (1964-1977).

Grigorovici and collaborators studied the structure, electrical transport, optical properties and photoconductivity in amorphous layers of germanium, silicon and carbon obtained by vacuum evaporation. Based on these results, Grigorovici was the first to highlight the structural differences between amorphous and microcrystalline layers of germanium and silicon; followed by the elaboration of a structural model, completed with energy considerations. This "amorphonic model", later refined in various laboratories as a "random network model", is today practically unanimously accepted as a structural model for amorphous semiconductors and has opened new avenues in research and applications.

These works brought international fame to the Grigorovici group, and to its initiator the recognition as a founding mentor of a Romanian research school in this field. The results were disseminated at international conferences and summer schools, in synthesis articles and monographs, were quoted extensively and had the appreciation of physicists of Nevill Francis Mott level. Radu Grigorovici has been co-opted in the organizing committees of numerous international congresses, in the editorial boards of specialized journals (Journal of Non-Crystalline Solids, Thin Solid Films, Physica Status Solidi) and in the Semiconductor Commission of the International Union of Pure Physics and Applied (1969-1975).

He was elected as the full member of the Romanian Academy in 1990 (he was a corresponding member since 1963) and its vice-president (1990–1994). Concerned with the "truth of life and the truth of science", he actively engaged in the regeneration of the Academy in the years following the communist dictatorship. He was an honorary member of the Academy of Sciences of Moldova and an honorary doctor of the University of Bucharest.

Known for his nonconformism and critical spirit, Radu Grigorovici has attracted, throughout his life, the admiration or antipathy of many. An American colleague called him "a world-renowned scientist, a humanist and a musician." He had a permanent and intense interest in literature, history and the arts. After the dismemberment of the Soviet empire, he initiated a sustained dialogue with the Romanians of Bukovina; published, in bilingual Romanian/German edition, a volume of studies and documents about Bucovina. He was a fine musician who, after time devoted to physics, relaxed by playing his favorite pieces from the great repertoire on the piano.

He died on August 1, 2008, in Bucharest.

Notes

1911 births
2008 deaths
Romanian physicists
Titular members of the Romanian Academy